Niklas Kastenhofer (born 8 January 1999) is a German professional footballer who plays as a centre-back for VfB Lübeck.

Career
Kastenhofer made his professional debut for Hallescher FC in the 3. Liga on 24 November 2018, coming on as a substitute in the 81st minute for Tobias Schilk in the 2–0 home win against Sonnenhof Großaspach.

References

External links
 Profile at DFB.de
 Profile at kicker.de

1999 births
Living people
Sportspeople from Halle (Saale)
Footballers from Saxony-Anhalt
German footballers
Association football central defenders
Hallescher FC players
VfB Lübeck players
3. Liga players
Regionalliga players
20th-century German people
21st-century German people